Consensus conference often refers to a type of citizens' assembly most common in Denmark.

Consensus conference may also refer to:

 a conference for scientific consensus 
 Monterrey Consensus, the outcome of the 2002 Monterrey Conference, the UN International Conference on Financing for Development

See also
 Consensus (disambiguation)

Consensus